The East Ham North by-election of 30 May 1957 was held after the death of Labour Party MP Percy Daines.

The seat was safe, having been won at the 1955 United Kingdom general election by over 5,500 votes

Result of the previous general election

Result of the by-election

References

1957 elections in the United Kingdom
1957 in London
Elections in the London Borough of Newham
By-elections to the Parliament of the United Kingdom in London constituencies
By-elections to the Parliament of the United Kingdom in Essex constituencies
1950s in Essex
East Ham